Fooding is a brand of a restaurant guide and gastronomic events that was founded in 2000. A contraction of the words "food" and "feeling", the Fooding aims (in the words of Frédéric Mitterrand) to "defend a less-intimidating gastronomy for those who want to cook and nourish themselves in an unstuffy fashion". This neologism appeared for the first time in 1999 in a Nova magazine article by French journalist and food critic, Alexandre Cammas. It has since become the brand of an annual restaurant guide (in print, online, and smartphone application) and of often charitable international culinary events.

The concept

According to Adam Gopnik in his New Yorker piece, the Fooding is to cuisine what the French New Wave was to French cinema. The hidden goal was to Americanize French food without becoming American, just as the New Wave, back in the 1950s and 1960s, was about taking in Hollywood virtues without being Hollywoodized—taking in some of the energy and optimism and informality that the French still associate with American movies while reimagining them as something distinctly French.

The Fooding's mission across its editorial activities and events is to make cuisine more expensive from the traditional codes and conventions that confine it, to give chefs the possibility of expressing themselves more fully, and to give contemporary eaters a true taste of the times. Through opening this "freer channel in the gastronomic universe", the Fooding emphasizes "the appetite for novelty and quality, rejection of boredom, love of fun, the ordinary, the sincere, and a yearning to eat with the times".
Initially established by Cammas along with fellow journalist and food critic Emmanuel Rubin, the Fooding was supported by Jean-François Bizot (founder of Actuel and Radio Nova), as well as by Bruno Delport, the director of Novapress. Since 2004, it has been under the support of Marine Bidaud, associate director of the Fooding.

The guide

As an independent food guide, the bills pay the Fooding for its reviewers, proving this by posting meal receipts on its website. It also refuses to give ad space to the restaurants it reviews in an attempt to remain financially separate. These are the essential conditions, says Cammas, for preserving freedom of expression and taste. In 2012, Cammas published an opinion piece in Le Monde, discussing the above conditions and defending the Michelin Guide’s ethics.

Though written entirely in French, the Tips in English allow Anglophones to follow the guide as well. The 2013 Fooding Guide, launched this November, now includes a section on favorite restaurants around the world.

The paper guide

The first editions of the Fooding guide (2000–2004) were released as special editions of Nova: Guide Fooding : 1000 adresses pour saliver Paris (The Fooding Guide: 1000 restaurants to drool over in Paris). In 2003 and 2004, two Fooding & Style special issues were published as a supplement to Nova magazine. In 2004, Nova Magazine stopped publication and, as a result, its special editions. In November 2005, the Paris Fooding Guide relaunched as a supplement to Libération, under the direction of Louis Dreyfus. In December 2005, the website launched with the online edition of the Paris Guide. The France Fooding Guide was published for the first time in 2006, again in partnership with Libération. As such, lefooding.com became a national guide.
In 2006 and 2007, the Fooding Guide followed Louis Dreyfus to the Nouvel Observateur, where he took up the post of general director. The 2008 France Guide then became a special edition of the Novel Observateur during summer 2007 with the subtitle 370 restaurants bien de chez nous – Guide vacances été 2007 (370 of our restaurants – Summer vacation guide 2007). The 2008 Paris Guide came out in September 2007 with the subtitle 400 restaurants pour embrasser le goût de l’époque (400 restaurants that embrace the taste of the times). In 2008, a few months after the death of Jean-François Bizot, the Fooding office moved in with the Inrockuptibles at the invitation of Frédéric Allary. In November 2008, for the first time in its history, the France Fooding Guide was published autonomously, under the exclusive direction of Alexandre Cammas and Marine Bidaud.

Le Fooding App

Launched at the end of October 2010, Le Fooding's iPhone app was originally available for free until 31 December 2010. The application was downloaded 80,000 times in two months. Since 1 January 2011, the France Guide iPhone app has been available as a paid application (€3.59). It was described in GQ as "the application reserved for gentlemen". In January 2013, the app was ranked 19th overall in top paid apps and 1st in the Food and Drink category. In August 2012, Le Fooding Guide app for Android was released on Google Play (€3.59). In 2014, the app is available in English and in a Premium version, which also includes the hotel guide. Starting January 2017 the app is free and updated regularly on both iPhone and Android platforms.

Le Fooding guide writers

Along with Alexandre Cammas (founder) and Yves Nespoulous (editor-in-chief), a large group of authors, journalists, food writers, writers, "bons vivants", bloggers and multi-talented people regularly contribute to the different editions of The Guide. These contributors include several emblematic figures of gastronomy and lifestyle, including Julie Andrieu, Sébastien Demorand, Trish Deseine, Frédérick Ernestine Grasser-Hermé, Dominique Hutin, Emmanuel Rubin (cofounder of Fooding Week in 2000 and former partner in Le Fooding Bureau) and Andrea Petrini. François-Régis Gaudry (journalist at L’Express, France Inter and Paris Première) said on his blog that he bylined his first gastronomy article for Le Fooding Guide in 2001. Many other collaborators made their debut as professional food lovers with Le Fooding Guide: Marie Aline, Kéda Black, Danièle Gerkens, Jérome Lefort, Francois Lemarie, Elvira Masson, Julia Sammut (former associate at Le Fooding Bureau), Victoire Loup and Hugo de St Phalle.

Controversies
Even though most foreign observers believe that Le Fooding contributes to the reinvention of the French culinary and event scene on an international scale, this is not always the case in France. Jean-Luc Petitrenaud in VSD wrote that Le Fooding is "a ridiculous trend for a few Parisian journalists looking for fame" (VSD, Winter 2004). Supporters of more traditional cuisine count several French journalistic institutions among Le Fooding's main detractors. A now-famous debate between the journalist  (anti-Fooding) and Alexandre Cammas during Paul Amar's TV program, Revu et Corrigé, is regularly featured in TV blooper shows.

On 15 November 2010, during the 10-year anniversary celebration of Le Fooding, then-current French Culture Minister Frédéric Mitterrand surprised the world of gastronomy by presenting Le Fooding Award to a Breton chef. A couple of days later, journalists Colette Monsat and François Simon questioned him in the 19 November 2010 issue of Madame Figaro, saying "You preach the values of traditional (French) cuisine but at the same time are an avid supporter of Le Fooding, which you praised this week for its playful, less formal approach to gastronomy." The Minister responded, "You can love Rembrandt and Basquiat. By appreciating Basquiat, one comes to have a taste for Rembrandt, and vice versa."

Seen as an alternative to the Michelin star system, Le Fooding emphasizes younger chefs and a broader range of cuisines and prices. Ironically, Michelin bought a large stake in Le Fooding in 2018 to have a platform that appeals to younger eaters.

References

External links

  
 Harris, Paul (3 April 2010). "French revolution as Le Fooding guide threatens the might of Michelin". The Guardian.
 McLaughlin, Katy (14 July 2010). "Let Them Eat Foie Gras! French Food Fights Back". The Wall Street Journal.
 Fabricant, Florence (30 April 2009). "Le Fooding Is Coming to New York". The New York Times.
  Ozersky, Josh (29 September 2010). "Culinary Rivals: New York City vs. San Francisco". Time.
 Beaudoin, Maurice & Simon, François & Alfandari, Maud (7 April 2009). "Fooding contre Michelin le match" Le Figaro. 

Food and drink appreciation
Culinary arts
Restaurant guides
2000 establishments